The Blue Ridge Rangers Rides Again is the eighth solo studio album by American roots rock singer-songwriter and guitarist John Fogerty, first released on September 1, 2009, on Fogerty's own label, Fortunate Son Records and distributed by Verve Forecast Records. The apparent grammatical error in the title of the album (the verb should be conjugated 'ride,' not 'rides') is a play on the fact that the original Blue Ridge Rangers (on the 1973 album The Blue Ridge Rangers) consisted entirely of Fogerty singing all the vocals and playing all the instruments by himself.

Recording
Originally announced in December 2008, the album was then titled The Return of the Blue Ridge Rangers and was slated for release by Fantasy Records, the label Fogerty recorded for with Creedence Clearwater Revival and his 2007 "comeback" album Revival. The album shares similarities in style with Fogerty's first solo album The Blue Ridge Rangers and included auto-remake of a song from the Eye of the Zombie album.

The album was recorded at Village Recorders in Santa Monica, California, in a 10-day session. Included in the group were Buddy Miller, Greg Leisz, Dennis Crouch, Jay Bellerose and Kenny Aronoff.  It was recorded mostly at Berkeley Street Studios in Santa Monica, California. Beginning tracks started in October 2008 at Village Recorders in Santa Monica with Mike Piersante (Engineer).  Additional sessions occurred with special guests, Bruce Springsteen and The Eagles' Don Henley and Timothy B. Schmit.

Track listing

Tracks not included
There were 15 songs recorded from a long list of songs that Fogerty, T-Bone Burnett and Lenny Waronker put together. Fogerty did not release the specific titles, but a Merle Haggard song was revealed to be among the three unreleased songs.

Production
The Blue Ridge Rangers Rides Again was arranged and produced by John Fogerty.
Seq....Subject
 Making of The Blue Ridge Rangers Rides Again album
 In-studio rehearsal: Change in the Weather
 In-studio rehearsal: Heaven's Just A Sin Away
 Preview of the new DVD Come Down the Road, the triumphant return to Albert Hall ... LISTEN

Charts

References

Notes
 John Fogerty NEWS Release

External links
 John Fogerty Home Page
  The Verve Music Group: Blue Ridge Rangers Rides Again

2009 albums
Albums produced by John Fogerty
John Fogerty albums
Sequel albums
Covers albums